Civilization: Is the West History? is a 2011 British TV documentary that tells how Western civilisation, in five centuries, transformed into the dominating civilisation in the world.

Presented by Niall Ferguson, the show reveals the 'killer apps' of the West's success – competition, science, the property owning democracy, modern medicine, the consumer society and the Protestant work ethic – the real explanation of how, for five centuries, a clear minority of mankind managed to secure the majority of the earth's resources.

Description

According to the historian, Western civilization's rise to global dominance is the single most important historical phenomenon of the past five centuries. All around the world, more and more people study at universities, work for companies, vote for governments, take medicines, wear clothes, and play sports, all of which have strong 'western' influences. Yet six hundred years ago the kingdoms of Western Europe seemed like miserable backwaters, ravaged by incessant war and pestilence. It was Ming China or Ottoman Turkey that had the look of world civilizations. How did the West overtake its Eastern rivals? And has the zenith of Western power now passed?

In Civilization: Is the West history?, the British historian Niall Ferguson argues that, beginning in the fifteenth century, the West developed six powerful new concepts that the Rest lacked: competition, science, the rule of law, modern medicine, consumerism, and the work ethic. These became  the "killer apps" that allowed the West to go ahead of the Rest; opening global trade routes, exploiting new scientific knowledge, evolving representative government, increasing life expectancy, unleashing the industrial revolution, and hugely increasing human productivity. Civilization shows exactly how a dozen Western empires came to control three-fifths of mankind and four-fifths of the world economy.

However, Ferguson argues that the days of Western predominance are numbered because the Rest have finally downloaded the six killer apps the West once monopolised – while the West has literally lost faith in itself.

Episodes

Reception
Brad Newsome of The Sydney Morning Herald wrote, "The provocative, pro-colonialist Ferguson won't be everyone's cup of tea but at least this series shows that the BBC does air a diversity of views." Tom Sutcliffe of The Independent wrote that Ferguson is "irritating in a very thought-provoking way". Sam Wollaston of The Guardian wrote, "Ferguson's is a no-nonsense approach: here's how it is, you better believe it. It's not especially charming, but it  certainly isn't boring – it's a rollicking roller-coaster ride through time, so much fun it doesn't even feel like school." Chris Harvey of The Daily Telegraph wrote, "His developing thesis was an enjoyable one, driven forward with the certainty that is Ferguson's style."

References

External links
 

Historical television series
British documentary television series
2011 British television series debuts
2011 British television series endings